The Church of the Abbey of Misericordia (Italian: Santa Maria dell'Abbazia della  Misericordia or Santa Maria di Valverde) is a religious edifice in Venice, Italy, in the sestiere Cannaregio.

History
It was founded in the tenth century. The façade was restored in 1659 by the patrician Gaspare Moro. It is decorated by allegoric statues, including a bust of Moro, all work by Clemente Molli. On the right is a 13th-century bas-relief depicting the Madonna with Child.

The church was in decay in the 19th century, and was restored until 1864. It is adjacent to the Scuola vecchia della Misericordia.

External links
 Churches of Venice

See also

References

10th-century establishments
Maria Misericordia
17th-century Roman Catholic church buildings in Italy